Walsh Centre Township is a township in Walsh County, North Dakota, United States.

References

See also
Walsh County, North Dakota

Townships in North Dakota
Townships in Walsh County, North Dakota